SS Cape May (T-AKR-5063) is a steam turbine powered heavy-lift  SEABEE barge carrier, one of two ships of her type in the Military Sealift Command's Ready Reserve Force. 

She was originally built as the Maritime Administration type (C8-S-82a) hull SS Almeria Lykes, ON 536671, IMO 7205958, under MARAD contract (MA 241), for commercial use with the Lykes Brothers Steamship Company. She was laid down on 31 October 1971, at the General Dynamics Quincy Shipbuilding Division, MA, hull no. 18, launched on 27 February 1972, and delivered for service on 26 September 1972. The ship was turned over to MARAD 25 July 1986, and assigned to MSC's RRF as SS Cape May (AKR-5063)

Cape May is used in various tasks for the US military in heavy transport of goods in various theaters of action. She is currently in ready reserve status ready to be called upon for any large cargo work needed.

See also
, her sister ship

External links
 
 SS Cape May
 SS Cape May NavSource
 Vehicle Cargo Ships - AKR

285904157143

Cape M-class heavy lift ships
1972 ships
Ships built in Quincy, Massachusetts